Paul Sykes (born 11 August 1981) is an English professional rugby league footballer who plays as a  for the Dewsbury Rams in the Betfred Championship. He was also the interim head-coach following the departure of Lee Greenwood. Sykes has played as a left-footed goal-kicking  and  during his career.

He has previously also played for Featherstone Rovers (captain), the Bradford Bulls, the London Broncos/Harlequins RL and the Wakefield Trinity Wildcats .

Background
Sykes was born in Dewsbury, West Yorkshire, England.

Bradford
Paul Sykes is a product of Bradford Bulls academy, making his breakthrough in the 1999 Bradford season during 1999's Super League IV. However opportunities at Odsal Stadium were limited and so Sykes went on loan spells at London in both the 2001 and 2002 seasons.

In his first spell at Bradford Bulls, he was loaned out to Wakefield RFC for which he played one game of Rugby Union.

Move to London
With the promise of more regular first XIII rugby Sykes moved south to join the London Broncos in a permanent deal in August 2002.

Sykes soon settled back to life in the capital and representative honours were gained with an appearance for England "A" against New Zealand in October, followed by a place on the successful "A" team tour to Fiji and Tonga.

Sykes has further earned England caps against Russia and Wales in 2003 and France and New Zealand in 2005.

Sykes originally came to the club as full-back, but the arrival of club captain Mark McLinden has seen Sykes operate largely in the centres in Super League X and XI.

Paul successfully converted during 2005 to the centre position where his powerful running and strong tackling are seen to their best advantage.

Super League XI saw Paul Sykes ruled out for much of the season after damaging his kidneys in February. However he made a comeback towards the end of the season after initially being ruled out for the entire campaign

2005 was a record breaking year for Sykes. On 27 February against the Wakefield Trinity Wildcats, Sykes kicked 12 goals from 12 attempts to break a 17-year-old London club record.

Further records for most goals and most points followed at the season's end and in recognition of these achievements Paul was voted Supporters' Player-of-the-Year for 2005.
Harlequins centre Paul Sykes has confirmed his expected move to Bradford for next season on a two-year contract.

Paul Sykes, who made his Great Britain début earlier this season, left Bradford on loan in 2002 to find first-team rugby.

Quins coach Brian McDermott also paid tribute to Sykes' contribution at the Stoop.

Bradford and the Wakefield Trinity Wildcats
Paul Sykes signed for Bradford Bulls in September 2007 as a replacement for the departing Ben Harris.

On rejoining Bradford he said: "A lot's changed at Bradford since the first time around and I think there's only Paul Deacon and Jamie Langley still there. "But I'm ready for a fresh challenge and I'm hoping to move back north to win some silverware. Bradford are always challenging and I'm glad I'm going to be a part of that. "Also, my girlfriend has just given birth to our first child as well and we want to be closer to our family." Boss Steve McNamara reckons he has picked up a rare talent, and added "I'm absolutely delighted to have secured an outstanding English centre and thank the board for making the deal possible".

In the 2012 season Sykes was loaned out to fellow West Yorkshire club the Wakefield Trinity Wildcats after only playing 2 games for Bradford Bulls. Here he managed to help lead the Wakefield Trinity Wildcats into the play-offs ironically at the expense of Bradford Bulls. Sykes soon signed a permanent 1-year deal with the Wakefield Trinity Wildcats for the 2013 season.

Career statistics

Great Britain
In June 2007 Sykes was called up to the Great Britain squad and will play in the centres in the Test match against France.

Sykes is joined in the Great Britain Test side by Harlequins RL teammate Chris Melling.

Paul Sykes made his Great Britain début in the 42–14 victory over the French on 22 June 2007, scoring one try.

England
In September 2008 he was named in the England training squad for the 2008 Rugby League World Cup, and in October 2008 he was named in the final 24-man England squad.

He has been named in the England team to face Wales at the Keepmoat Stadium, Doncaster, prior to England's departure for the 2008 Rugby League World Cup.

Sykes has also represented the England in their warm up match against Wales before the 2009 Four Nations.

References

External links
(archived by web.archive.org) Bradford Bulls profile
(archived by web.archive.org) Sykes in Bulls Return
 Sykes joins Broncos
 Harlequins' Sykes out for season
 Injured Sykes extends Quins stay
(archived by web.archive.org) super League Profile

1981 births
Living people
Black British sportsmen
Bradford Bulls players
Dewsbury Rams captains
Dewsbury Rams coaches
Dewsbury Rams players
England national rugby league team players
English people of West Indian descent
English rugby league players
Featherstone Rovers captains
Featherstone Rovers players
Great Britain national rugby league team players
London Broncos players
Rugby league centres
Rugby league five-eighths
Rugby league fullbacks
Rugby league players from Dewsbury
Wakefield RFC players
Wakefield Trinity players